Aris Antoniades (Greek: Άρης Αντωνιάδης; born December 2, 1991) is a Greek-Cypriot composer, arranger, and orchestrator. Antoniades has composed and arranged music for concert, film, and theater. Some of his most notable works include Chiaroscuro, a symphonic piece that was first performed at the Riverside Church under the baton of conductor George Manahan and later recorded by the National Radio Symphony Orchestra of Greece (ΕRΤ); his Toccata & Fugue for Organ, that was performed at the Cathedral of St. John the Divine in New York City; and his big band arrangement of Lalo Schifrin's Mission Impossible Theme which was performed by multi-Grammy nominated percussionist and band leader Bobby Sanabria at Dizzy's Club - Jazz at Lincoln Center. As an arranger and orchestrator, he has written for twenty-eight-time gold and platinum album vocalist (IFPI Greece) Alkistis Protopsalti, as well as Michalis Hatzigiannis, George Perris, and X-Factor (Greece) judges George Theofanous and Mariza Rizou.

Early life and education 
Antoniades was born and raised in Limassol, Cyprus, and began taking piano lessons at age 5. After being awarded a scholarship from the Fulbright Commission, he moved to the United States where he completed his bachelor's and master's degrees in classical composition at the Manhattan School of Music in New York City, receiving the Provost's Award for Academic Excellence upon graduation.

Musical career 
Antoniades' concert works have been performed in various international venues and music festivals. Most recently, his original big band adaptations of Cypriot folk songs were featured at the Kypria International Festival. Aside from concert works, he has written extensively for film and theater, having scored seven short-films - including the film "Bizone" whose Main Theme was released on all major streaming platforms in 2019. His latest original theater score was for the Greek experimental play Women of Soil (Greek: Γυναίκες από Χώμα). His work Nostos for saxophone and piano, co-commissioned by the University of Sydney and the Australian ensemble HD Duo, was featured in the group's new album Music of the Commonwealth, published by Da Vinci Classics in November 2021.      

As of January 2021, he is the artistic director and principal conductor of the TrakArt Pops Orchestra in his homeland, Cyprus. In that capacity he has collaborated with internationally acclaimed Greek composer and pianist Stefanos Korkolis, as well as other important figures of the Greek music world, including singers Kostas Hadjichristodoulou and Sofia Manousaki, and film/T.V. composer Costas Cacoyannis.

References

External links 
 
 

1991 births
Living people
People from Limassol